Oligosoma suteri, known commonly as Suter's skink, the black shore skink, the egg-laying skink, and Suter's ground skink, is a species of lizard in the family Scincidae. The species is endemic to New Zealand.

Oviparity
Oligosoma suteri is the only native New Zealand skink to lay eggs – hence another of its common names, the "egg-laying skink". (The egg-laying rainbow skink, Lampropholis delicata,  is present in some parts of New Zealand, but is introduced from Australia). Females dig nests and lay eggs under sand, pebbles or boulders from late December to mid February. Eggs hatch sooner if incubated at warmer temperatures, taking 75–80 days when incubated at 22 °C, and approximately 55 days at a constant 26 °C.

Geographic range
Oligosoma suteri lives on northern offshore islands, from the Three Kings Islands to the Alderman Islands, at latitudes north of 37°S.

Biology
Oligosoma suteri inhabits the coast, often very close to the water, eating mainly intertidal amphipods that in turn subsist on dead seaweed. It is known to hunt for prey in rock pools and is a capable swimmer. Suter's skink reaches densities (up to 13/m2) that are among the highest lizard densities recorded anywhere in the world.

Etymology
Both the specific name, suteri, and two of the common names, "Suter's skink" and "Suter's ground skink", honour Henry Suter (1841–1918), New Zealand zoologist and palaeontologist.

References

Further reading
Boulenger GA (1906). "Descriptions of Two New Lizards from New Zealand". Ann. Mag. Nat. Hist., Seventh Series 17: 369-371 + Plate X. (Lygosoma suteri, new species, pp. 369–370 + Plate X, figure 1).
Hare, Kelly M.; Daugherty, Charles H.; Chapple, David G. (2008) "Comparative phylogeography of three skink species (Oligosoma moco, O. smithi, O. suteri ; Reptilia: Scincidae) in northeastern New Zealand". Molecular Phylogenetics and Evolution 46 (1): 303-315.

suteri
Reptiles of New Zealand
Reptiles described in 1906
Taxa named by George Albert Boulenger